Valley Metro Rail (styled as METRO) is a  light rail line serving the cities of Phoenix, Tempe, and Mesa in Arizona, USA. The network, which is part of the Valley Metro public transit system, began operations on December 27, 2008.

In the years since it opened in 2008, the system has undergone four expansions (including the Tempe Streetcar), with at least three more scheduled. Furthermore, extensions are planned into West Phoenix at Desert Sky Mall and to South Phoenix at Baseline Road, all of which were expanded as a direct result of obtaining funding under the Proposition 104 sales tax increase.

Cost and infrastructure
The expected construction cost for the initial  was $1.4 billion, or $70 million per mile. In 2008, Valley Metro estimated the train would cost $184 million to operate over the following five years with fares covering $44 million of the operation costs and tax subsidies covering the remaining costs.

Trains operate on city streets in a "center reservation", similar to the Red Line of the METRORail light rail system in Houston, the surface sections of the MBTA subway's Green Line in Boston, and some surface sections of the Muni Metro in San Francisco and TRAX in Salt Lake City. Some parts of the line, such as the bridge over Tempe Town Lake (near State Route 202), have no contact with other traffic.

History

Numerous plans have preceded the current implementation of light rail. The Phoenix Street Railway provided streetcar service from 1887 to 1948. Historic vehicles may be seen at the Arizona Street Railway Museum, with Car #116 celebrating her 80th birthday on December 25, 2008, just days before the opening of modern rail service. In 1989, the ValTrans elevated rail proposal was turned down by voters in a referendum due to cost and feasibility concerns. Subsequent initiatives during the 1990s failed over similar reasons.

Metro was created by the Transit 2000 Regional Transportation Plan (RTP), also called the Transit 2000 plan, which involved a 0.5 per cent sales tax, and was approved by Phoenix voters in 2000. Transit 2000 aimed at improving the local bus service (considered unacceptably inadequate compared to other major US cities) and the formation of bus rapid transit and light rail, among other things, which was seen as a more affordable approach. It used the route placing and color designations from the 1989 ValTrans plan.

Construction on the new light rail line began in March 2005. In March 2008, cracks in the system's rails were discovered. The cause of the cracks was determined to be improper use of plasma cutting torches by contractors. The affected track was repaired by May at a cost of $600,000 with still no word on which parties will be held financially responsible. The last of the concrete and rail for the system was installed in the end of April, with the CEO declaring the system to be on time and on budget.

There are 28 stations on the initial  starter segment. The line celebrated its grand opening on December 27, 2008, with official ribbon-cutting ceremonies and community celebrations throughout Phoenix, Tempe, and Mesa. The event was produced by Arizona's Entertainment Solutions, Inc. and was attended by thousands of local residents who waited as long as an hour or more to ride the vehicles. The stations have been designed to complement their immediate surroundings.

As of early 2014, income has exceeded Metro's stated goal with 44.6% farebox recovery, partially due to the light rail ridership far exceeding original projections. The light rail has also led to rapid urban development in downtown Phoenix and Tempe, generating additional revenue through taxes.

Valley Metro had its busiest month in April 2017, with a total passenger count of 1,514,456 and an average weekday ridership of 52,910. On the weekend of March 31, 2017, through April 2, 2017, the light rail system saw 275,615 passengers board the train due to several large events including Final Four Fan Fest, March Madness Music Festival, Arizona Diamondbacks home opener, Phoenix Pride Festival, Phoenix Suns game, and Tempe Festival of the Arts. That Sunday, April 2, 2017, they saw 80,210 passengers board the train thanks to fans attending the Arizona Diamondbacks home opening game as well as the other large events occurring that weekend.

Central Mesa Extension
The Central Mesa Extension extended rail service  from the line's original eastern terminus at Sycamore Street in the median of Main Street to Mesa Drive. It added four stations at Alma School Road, Country Club Drive, Center Street, and Mesa Drive. In March 2012, Valley Metro selected a design-build joint venture between Kiewit Corporation and Mass. Electric to construct the extension. Construction began in July 2012 and passenger service began on August 22, 2015. Mesa held a summit in early 2012 to have urban developers give their ideas on how to revitalize Downtown Mesa. The extension cost $200 million, paid for from a combination of Proposition 400 sales tax revenues and federal air quality and New Starts grants, and is estimated to have added 5,000 daily riders.

Northwest Extension Phase I

Phase I of the Northwest Extension was the first to extension within the Phoenix city limits. The system was extended north from the previous terminus at Montebello Avenue along the median of 19th Avenue to a new terminus and park and ride at the southwest corner of 19th Avenue and Dunlap Avenue. The extension features two additional stations, located at Northern Avenue and Glendale Avenue and is predicted to serve 5,000 riders per day in its first full year of operation.

As an original part of the Transit 2000 plan, this extension was originally scheduled to open by 2012. However, a combination of lower than expected sales tax revenues, combined with uncertainty surrounding the availability of federal funds to support the project resulted in the opening date being pushed back initially to 2014, and then by 9 years, to fiscal year 2023, by the Phoenix City Council in June 2009.

In July 2012, a vote was held to reschedule this extension to open in 2016. Under this plan, the city of Phoenix advanced $60 million of local funds to Valley Metro Rail, who would then fund the remaining cost of the project (approximately $267 million) with both Transit 2000 and Proposition 400 funds, thereby allowing work on the project to begin.

The design-build contract was awarded to a joint venture of Sundt and Stacy and Witbeck, for the  extension. Construction began in January 2013, with a celebration to mark the laying of the first track section being held in July 2014. Construction work continued until December 2015, when it was announced the extension would open March 19, 2016, and that testing along the new stretch would continue.

50th Street infill station
The 50th Street infill station project adds a new station to the existing alignment at 50th Street and Washington. The project aimed to enable better connectivity with nearby businesses, and recent commercial and residential development projects in the area.

The project, funded entirely by the City of Phoenix, began construction in June 2017; service to the new station started on April 25, 2019.

Gilbert Road Extension
An extension further eastward,  past the current terminus at Mesa Drive to Gilbert Road, began construction in October 2016, and began operating on May 18, 2019. The line, budgeted at approximately $184 million, travels in the median of Main Street and has one intermediate stop at Stapley Drive. The design-build contract for this project was awarded to Sundt/Stacy and Witbeck, with Jacobs Engineering providing design services for the project. Service to the new stations started on May 18, 2019.

Tempe Streetcar

Tempe Streetcar consist of 14 stations, running from Dorsey Lane west on Apache Boulevard, then north on Mill Avenue. From there, it loops around Downtown Tempe along Mill and Ash avenues. The route continues along Rio Salado Parkway to Marina Heights, with a possible extension to Mesa to connect with the Chicago Cubs’ new spring training facility, as well as Tempe Marketplace. Service began on May 20, 2022.

Proposition 105 and South Extension
After voters approved a tax measure in August 2015 to fund transportation, the City of Phoenix moved the timeline of the light rail extension to South Phoenix up by a decade. Outreach to the residents and business owners of South Phoenix became strained when the extension called for the reduction of lanes from four to two along Central Avenue. In February 2019, opponents were able to gather enough signatures to require the city to hold a referendum on future light rail expansion. The referendum to stop light rail expansion, known as Proposition 105, failed to pass in a special election on August 27, 2019. Construction on the South Central extension began in October 2019 and it is expected to be operational by 2024.

Operations

Route description

, the Valley Metro Rail system consists of one single line serving all 38 stations total, and denoted with a gold-yellow color on Valley Metro publications. At Roosevelt, the line splits into one-way segments: Mesa-bound service runs on First Avenue south before turning east on Jefferson Street; likewise, Dunlap-bound one-way service starts at 26th Street on Washington Street before turning north on Central Avenue.

After both tracks rejoin east of 24th Street on Washington Street, it continues past Sky Harbor Airport – which is connected by the PHX Sky Train at  – then turns southeast toward Tempe. The line leaves Washington Street and crosses Tempe Town Lake on its own bridge parallel to the Union Pacific Railroad before turning east along Mill Avenue (where the Tempe Streetcar connects at Mill Avenue/3rd St) and then proceeding via its own right-of-way near ASU. Going southward, it joins Apache Boulevard headed eastward, which becomes Main Street in the city of Mesa, where the light rail line ends at an intersection with Gilbert Road.

Hours and headways
Full service on the line begins Monday through Friday at approximately 4:30 a.m., while Saturday and Sunday service begins at approximately 4:50 a.m. Service ends at approximately 1 a.m. Monday through Thursday nights, weekend service ends at 3:25 a.m. Friday and Saturday mornings, with Sunday service ending at approximately 12:30 a.m. Monday morning.

Due to the fact a complete light rail trip takes approximately 90 minutes from end to end, trains departing at 11 p.m. for example end by 12:25 a.m. This limited service extends the line's operating hours to as early as 3:30 a.m. all days, as late as 1:20 a.m. Sunday through Thursday, and as late as 4:20 a.m. on Friday and Saturday. Every day, 1–4 eastbound PM rush hour trips short-turn at 44th Street/Washington and 1–4 westbound PM rush hour trips short-turn at Priest Drive/Washington.

Weekday frequencies consist of every 12 minutes, Saturday daytime service every 15 minutes, and Sunday and evening service every 20 minutes.

Rolling stock
, Valley Metro Rail operates a fleet of 50 Kinki Sharyo Low Floor Light Rail Vehicles (LRVs), which were built exclusive to VMR. Each vehicle has a seated capacity of 66. Due to the desert climate of the Phoenix area the units were designed with more insulation and solar reflective windows as well as larger air conditioner units. The vehicles are accessible with space for four wheelchairs and four bicycles, per vehicle with addition to a hydraulic levelling system to remove potential vertical gap, to ease loading. Up to three vehicles may operate together in a single train set but are typically in sets of two. The LF-LRVs are also equipped with energy absorbent bumpers to reduce the effects of road vehicle collision, measures warranted due to the light rail mostly running in the center of streets.

In 2017, Valley Metro contracted Brookville Equipment Corporation and Siemens Mobility for six and 11 light rail vehicles, respectively, with the Brookville fleet planned to be used for Tempe Streetcar service. The first Siemens car arrived in March 2020 and the first Brookville car for Tempe in March 2021.

Fares

Valley Metro Rail shares its fare system with the Valley Metro Bus system, but uses a proof-of-payment system to allow for simplified boarding and platform access. Tickets can be purchased from ticket vending machines at the entrance to all stations but must be validated before boarding the train.

Fare inspections are conducted throughout the system at random to ensure compliance. , the system has a fare-compliance rate of 94%.

Future extensions and improvements

South Central Extension (2024)

The South Central Extension will run from Downtown Phoenix, south along Central Avenue to Baseline Road, adding  and seven stations, while connecting with two park and ride locations.

Additionally, this project will form a light rail hub in Downtown Phoenix, between Central and First avenues to the west and east, and Washington and Jefferson streets to the north and south. Also included are new tracks for turn-around / staging purposes at both Third Avenue and Fifth Street for enhanced flexibility during peak service. Trains along the segment are planned to operate as a new line, originating at Baseline Road and running to the Downtown Hub before interlining with the existing light rail system and continuing north to the terminus at Dunlap Avenue/19th Avenue.

After receiving environmental approval from the Federal Transit Administration (FTA) in January 2017, the project entered the design phase. Construction began in 2019, with completion expected in 2024.

Northwest Extension Phase II (2024)
Upon completion of Northwest Phase I, focus shifted to Phase II of the project. Estimated to be complete by 2024, this extension will continue west on Dunlap Avenue before turning to head north along 25th Avenue. From there, the system will head west on Mountain View Road, before crossing Interstate 17 and terminating on the east side of Metrocenter Mall. The extension is expected to include three new stations, one in the vicinity of 25th Avenue and Dunlap, another adjacent to the Rose Mofford Sports Complex and a relocated transit center on the east side of Metrocenter Mall.

By October 2017, the project had entered the environmental assessment (EA) phase. The construction contract was awarded to Kiewit-McCarthy in July 2020 and is scheduled to break ground in the Fall.

Capitol Extension

The Capitol Extension will run from Central Station and 1st Avenue/Jefferson in Downtown Phoenix west to the Arizona State Capitol.  preliminary engineering work is underway and the project team has begun preparations for the environmental assessment.

I-10 West Extension
The I-10 West Extension would run from the state capitol west to Interstate 17 before turning north to the interchange of Interstate 10 and I-17 ("The Stack"). Then the line will turn west and continue down I-10 in the median past 43rd Avenue. It will then go over the westbound lanes of I-10 to continue alongside the highway to the 79th Avenue/I-10 Park-and-Ride, adding  and 11 stations to connect the West Valley and ease congestion on Interstate 10. The line will transfer over I-10 from the median to the shoulder to accommodate the proposed extension of Loop 202, which will connect with I-10 around 51st Avenue. In fall 2021, the Phoenix City Council approved extending the project corridor to the Desert Sky Transit Center, adjacent to the Desert Sky Mall.  preliminary engineering work is underway.

West Phoenix/Glendale

Starting in 2013, Valley Metro along with the cities of Glendale and Phoenix approved a project to study the potential extension of light rail, bus rapid transit or streetcar to Glendale. Initially, three different route options were proposed, all of which headed west from the current light rail system and featured a shared terminus in the Downtown Glendale area. Options included travel directly across Glendale Avenue, as well as routes that travel along Camelback Road and a combination of 43rd and 51st avenues, before entering the shared downtown terminus area.

Light rail was selected as the preferred type of transit for the route, as opposed to bus rapid transit or streetcar.

On October 17, 2017, Glendale City Council directed staff against moving forward on a route into downtown Glendale, effectively killing the plans for the Glendale portion of the extension. At the beginning of 2019, Phoenix City Council voted to indefinitely delay the remaining Phoenix portion of the project.

Other
, an extension was planned to occur to Arizona State University's West campus in 2044. A previous study into a Northeast light rail corridor has been suspended indefinitely, with Phoenix City Council directing funds towards street maintenance instead.

, extensions of streetcar and light rail in Tempe, Mesa, and Chandler were being studied.

A northeast extension to Paradise Valley Mall, closely following Arizona State Route 51 is also being considered.

See also

 PHX Sky Train
 Phoenix Public Transportation
 Light rail in North America
 List of tram and light rail transit systems
 List of rail transit systems in the United States

References
Informational notes

Citations

External links

 
 Article on Valley Metro Rail and preemptive urban revitalization
 Slideshow of photos on light rail construction and progress – from azcentral.com
 A BRIEF HISTORY OF PUBLIC TRANSPORTATION IN METRO PHOENIX
 South Phoenix light rail on fast track, to come a decade early
 Allhands: No, transit STILL doesn't go there | Phoenix

 
Arizona railroads
Electric railways in Arizona
2008 establishments in Arizona
Railway lines opened in 2008
Proposed railway lines in the United States
Valley Metro
750 V DC railway electrification
Rail transportation in Phoenix, Arizona